"Maybe Tomorrow" is a song from Welsh rock band Stereophonics' fourth studio album, You Gotta Go There to Come Back (2003). Written and produced by Stereophonics frontman Kelly Jones, the song was released as a single on 21 July 2003 and peaked at number three on the UK Singles Chart. It also charted in several other countries, including the United States, where it reached the top five of the Billboard Adult Alternative Songs chart.

Background

Written and produced by Kelly Jones, "Maybe Tomorrow" was used as the opening theme of the movie Wicker Park (2004) and was played during the credits at the end of the Academy Award-winning movie Crash (2004). The track has more of a jazz ambience than some of their other songs; this and the whole album were considered a departure from the classic rock sound of previous album Just Enough Education to Perform.

Reception and awards
The song became the band's second-highest chart position (alongside "The Bartender and the Thief"), peaking at number three on the UK Singles Chart in July 2003; it was their highest-charting song until "Dakota" reached number one in 2005. In January 2020 the British Phonographic Industry (BPI) awarded the song a platinum certification for sales and streams exceeding 600,000. Outside the United Kingdom, the song reached number 17 in the Netherlands, number 18 in Ireland, and number 33 in Italy. In the United States, the song became the second of three Stereophonics singles to appear on a Billboard chart, peaking at number five on the Adult Alternative Songs chart in January 2004.

Track listings

UK CD1
 "Maybe Tomorrow" – 4:32
 "Have Wheels Will Travel" – 3:14
 "Change Changes Things" – 3:21

UK CD2
 "Maybe Tomorrow" (demo) – 3:51
 "Madame Helga" (demo) – 3:55
 "Sail Away" (demo) – 4:19

UK DVD single
 "Maybe Tomorrow" (audio)
 The making of "Maybe Tomorrow" (video)

UK 7-inch single
A. "Maybe Tomorrow" – 4:32
B. "Have Wheels Will Travel" – 3:14

European CD single
 "Maybe Tomorrow" – 4:32
 "Royal Flush" – 3:29

Australian CD single
 "Maybe Tomorrow" – 4:32
 "Madame Helga" – 3:54
 "Royal Flush" (mono demo) – 3:29
 "Madame Helga" (live at Glastonbury 2002) – 3:55
 "Maybe Tomorrow" (video)

Credits and personnel
Credits are taken from the You Gotta Go There to Come Back album booklet.

Recording
 Written in June 2002 at Number 23
 Recorded between September and December 2002 at Hook End Manor (Checkendon, England)
 Mixed at Ocean Way (Hollywood, California)
 Mastered at Abbey Road Studios (London, England)

Personnel

 Kelly Jones – writing, vocals, guitar, Wurlitzer, Mellotron, production
 Richard Jones – bass
 Tony Kirkham – Mellotron, Rhodes
 Stuart Cable – drums
 "Whoever was in the room!" – percussion
 Andy Davies – recording assistant
 Jack Joseph Puig – mixing
 Jim Lowe – engineering
 Steve McNichol – Pro Tools engineering
 Chris Blair – mastering

Charts and certifications

Weekly charts

Year-end charts

Certifications

Release history

References

2003 singles
2003 songs
Festival Records singles
Songs written by Kelly Jones
Stereophonics songs
UK Independent Singles Chart number-one singles
V2 Records singles